Luke Samoa (born 13 May 1988) is a New Zealand-born Romanian rugby union football player. He plays in the fullback position for professional SuperLiga clubTimișoara . He also plays for Romania's national team, the Oaks, making his international debut at the 2017 Rugby Europe Championship in a match against the German national rugby union team.

Career
Before joining Timișoara Luke Samoa played Rugby League for Norths Devils in the Intrust Super Cup and, most recently, for Știința Baia Mare.

Honours
Știința Baia Mare
 SuperLiga: 2014

Timișoara
 SuperLiga: 2017/2018

References

External links

Timișoara

1988 births
Living people
Rugby union players from Auckland
Romanian rugby union players
Romania international rugby union players
New Zealand rugby union players
New Zealand sportspeople of Samoan descent
Rugby union fullbacks
CSM Știința Baia Mare players